Ham Radio Deluxe is an amateur radio software program which is used with external RF hardware.

Modules 
There are five modules within Ham Radio Deluxe.

 Rig Control
 Logbook
 DM-780
 Satellite Tracking
 Rotor Control

Review retaliation controversy 

The company caused controversy in 2016 by disabling the licenses of users who gave its product unfavorable reviews.

 An owner of the company apologized in a forum post for the incident.

See also 

 List of amateur radio software
 Software-defined radio
 Universal Software Radio Peripheral

References

External links 

 

Amateur radio
VoIP software
Windows Internet software
Internet software for Linux
Amateur radio software for Linux
Amateur radio software for Windows